Robert Grove may refer to:

 Robert Grove (MP) for Shaftesbury
 Robert Grove (bishop) (1634–1696), English Bishop of Chichester
 Lefty Grove (Robert Moses Grove, 1900–1975), baseball pitcher
 Art Grove (Robert Arthur Grove, 1923–1984), basketball player
 Bob Grove, character in the 1955 British comedy film It's a Great Day
 Bob Grove (ice hockey), announcer for the Pittsburgh Penguins
 Bob Grove (producer)
 Bobby Grove (footballer) (died 1964), Scottish footballer

See also
 Robert Groves (disambiguation)